"Lucid Dreams" (alternatively "Lucid Dreams (Forget Me)") is a song by American rapper and singer Juice WRLD. It was officially released by Grade A Productions and Interscope Records on May 4, 2018, after previously being released on SoundCloud in June 2017. The song was produced by Nick Mira and debuted at number 74 on the Billboard Hot 100, peaking at number 2 on the chart.

The song has over 2.1 billion streams on Spotify, being one of the most streamed songs on the platform. A remix featuring fellow American rapper and singer Lil Uzi Vert was recorded in 2018 but remained unreleased due to sample clearance issues. The remix leaked online in May 2021 after fans pooled together $12,000 to purchase the song from leakers. On May 28, 2021, the remix was officially released  as a part of the re-release of Goodbye & Good Riddance that commemorates the album's third anniversary. In February 2022 the song was certified Diamond by RIAA for selling over 10 million units in the U.S. The song has since come to be regarded as Juice WRLD's signature song.

Background
In a June 2018 interview with Lyrical Lemonade, Juice Wrld stated the song was made to be a "therapy session" during a period of relationship problems he was encountering.

"Lucid Dreams" was initially released on SoundCloud on June 15, 2017, alongside the EP JuiceWrld 9 9 9. It eventually accumulated 2.5 million plays, leading to an official release as a single on May 4, 2018.

In November 2018, producer Nick Mira revealed that Sting owned 85% of the rights to "Lucid Dreams," which features an interpolation of his 1993 hit "Shape of My Heart".

In October 2019, members of then-defunct pop punk band Yellowcard sued Juice Wrld for $15 million, claiming that "Lucid Dreams" copied the melody of their song "Holly Wood Died". Following Juice Wrld's death on December 8, 2019, the band extended a "deadline for defendants to respond to the lawsuits" into February 2020. Yellowcard's law firm King & Fallow issued a statement disputing the $15 million figure in the lawsuit as "falsely reported" with the final figure yet to be determined. While expressing sympathies for Juice WRLD's sudden death, the firm said the action would be pursued despite "incredible mixed emotions" from the band and firm. After Juice Wrld's mother became the representative of his estate, Yellowcard quietly dropped the lawsuit on July 27, 2020, with the band's lawyer, Richard S. Busch, stating that the band was “very sympathetic not only of Juice WRLD’s death, but also needed time to decide whether they really wanted to pursue the case against his grieving mother as the personal representative of his estate.” Busch did however state that the case could be refiled if the band were to change their minds.

Composition
"Lucid Dreams" runs for four minutes. The meter is common time ( time) and the key is F minor.  The tempo is 84 BPM. The song is structured around an interpolation of Sting's 1993 song "Shape of My Heart".

Music video
A music video for "Lucid Dreams" was directed by Cole Bennett, released and uploaded on Lyrical Lemonade Youtube channel on May 11, 2018. It features Juice Wrld trapped up to his head in a floor, with his body tied down, and has been described by Milca P. of HotNewHipHop as "psychedelic and abstract". The music video has amassed more than 870 million views on YouTube.

Reception
The song debuted at number 74 on the Billboard Hot 100 on the week ending May 26, 2018, with 10 million US streams and 4,000 digital downloads. The song jumped to number 35 the following week and then number 15. When it ascended to number nine, "Lucid Dreams" became Juice Wrld's first top 10 song on June 12, with 35.9 million US streams and 9,000 downloads. Reaching number three on the chart in July, the song lingered in the top 10 for months until it peaked at number two in October, blocked from the top spot by Maroon 5 and Cardi B's "Girls Like You". Following Juice Wrld's death in December 2019, "Lucid Dreams" re-entered the Hot 100 at number eight, becoming its 26th nonconsecutive week in the top ten.

During the 2019 Grammy telecast, host Alicia Keys performed 30 seconds of "Lucid Dreams", singing and playing piano, during a segment on songs about heartache.

In 2019, Billboard and NME ranked "Lucid Dreams" at number two and number one, respectively, on their lists of the greatest Juice Wrld songs.

Charts

Weekly charts

Year-end charts

Decade-end charts

Certifications

Release history

References

External links
 

2017 songs
2018 singles
Interscope Records singles
Songs written by Sting (musician)
Juice Wrld songs
Songs written by Juice Wrld
Songs involved in plagiarism controversies
Sampling controversies
Music videos directed by Cole Bennett
Songs written by Nick Mira
Songs about dreams
Songs written by Taz Taylor (record producer)